Crenicichla chicha is a species of cichlid native to South America. It is found in the Rio Papagaio, upper rio Tapajós basin, Mato Grosso, Brazil.

References

chicha
Freshwater fish of Brazil
Taxa named by Henrique Rosa Varella 
Taxa named by Sven O. Kullander
Taxa named by Flávio César Thadeo de Lima
Fish described in 1991